Hornor is a surname. Notable people with the surname include:

Charles W. Hornor (1813–1905), American lawyer and political activist
Edward Hornor Coates (1846-1921), American businessman
John Hornor Jacobs (born 1971), American author
Lynn Hornor (1874–1933), American politician 
Thomas Hornor (surveyor) (1785–1844), British land surveyor, artist and inventor